The Conference of Federal State Prime Ministers is a committee formed by the sixteen States of Germany (Bundesländer) to coordinate policy in areas that fall within the sole jurisdiction of the Länder, e.g. broadcasting. The conference is not a constitutional body, therefore formal agreements between the federal states are fixed in a Staatsvertrag (treaty/compact).

The first meeting of the conference took place in 8–10 July 1948, preceding the formation of the Federal Republic of Germany. Since 1954 it is a permanent institution.

The conference meets four times a year. The chair of the meeting is rotated on an annual basis among the federal states according to a fixed rotation:
Lower Saxony
Hesse
Saxony
Rhineland-Palatinate
Saxony-Anhalt
Schleswig-Holstein
Thuringia
Baden-Württemberg
Brandenburg
Bremen
Mecklenburg-Vorpommern
Saarland
Hamburg
Bavaria
Berlin
North Rhine-Westphalia

References

Ministers-President in Germany